Kalamazoo, MI 1997 is a live release by Athens, Georgia's Widespread Panic. These performances were recorded live at The State Theater in Kalamazoo, Michigan on November 11, 1997. This recording features all original band members including late guitarist Michael Houser.

This was the 13th installment of the Porch Songs series.

Track listing

Disc 1
Weight Of The World (Widespread Panic) – 6:32	
Aunt Avis (Vic Chesnutt) – 6:41	
Walkin' (For Your Love) (Widespread Panic) – 5:34	
You'll Be Fine (Widespread Panic) – 3:19	
Glory (Widespread Panic) – 3:48	
Rock (Widespread Panic) – 8:01	
Big Wooly Mammoth (Widespread Panic) – 7:53	
One Kind Favor (Son House) – 7:12	
Love Tractor (Widespread Panic) – 5:57

Disc 2
Let's Get Down To Business (Vic Chesnutt) – 6:49	
Hope in a Hopeless World (Pops Staples/Phil Roy/Bob Thiele Jr.) – 5:29	
Disco (Widespread Panic) – 6:16	
Diner (Widespread Panic) – 19:03	
Arleen (Winston Riley) – 9:24

Disc 3
Drums (Widespread Panic) – 17:17	
Pilgrims (Widespread Panic) – 8:20	
B of D (Widespread Panic) – 3:50	
Raise The Roof (Widespread Panic) – 4:56	
Last Dance (Neil Young) – 7:25	
Makes Sense To Me (Hutchens) – 5:20

Personnel
  John Bell – Vocals, Guitar
 Michael Houser – Guitar, Vocals
 Dave Schools – Bass
 Todd Nance – Drums
 John "JoJo" Hermann – Keyboards, Vocals
 Domingo "Sunny" Ortiz – Percussion

References

External links
 Widespread Panic website
 Widespread Panic Archives Blog

Widespread Panic live albums
2012 live albums